General Tariq Majid  (born 23 August 1950) is a retired four-star rank army general in the Pakistan Army who served as the 13th Chairman of the Joint Chiefs of Staff Committee from 2007 to 2010, the principal and highest-ranking military adviser in the Pakistan Armed Forces.

Prior to this promotion, he was the field operational commander of X Corps, stationed in Rawalpindi. His other commanding staff assignments includes the Chief of General Staff (CGS) from 2003 to 2006 and Director General of the Military Intelligence (DGMI) from 2000 to 2003, all premier staff commands of the Pakistan Army. He was succeeded as chairman joint chiefs by another four-star rank general officer General Khalid Shameem Wynne.

Biography

Personal background 
Tariq Majid was born on 23 August 1950 in Lahore, Punjab, Pakistan. He was educated at Government Islamia College, Civil Lines, Lahore. Tariq Majid entered in the Pakistan Military Academy in Kakul, in 1967.  He graduated with a Bachelor's degree from PMA in 1971 and commissioned in the Pakistan Army as a 2nd Lieutenant in the 28th Light anti-tank weapon Battalion of the Baloch Regiment of Pakistan Army in April 1971. After participating in the 1971 war, Majid went on to obtain master of science in Joint warfare from the Command and Staff College in Quetta in 1982.

Professorship and academia
Apart from active military service, Majid has tenured as professor of military and strategic studies at the both military and civilian institutions. He taught and lectured courses on military science, defense and war studies, and military policy matters at the Department of Strategic and Defense Studies of the Quaid-e-Azam University in Islamabad. In 1985, he was sent to attend the Malaysian Armed Forces Staff College in Kuala Lumpur where he did specialization on staff courses. From 1985 and onward, Majid went to United States and joined the Asia-Pacific Center for Security Studies in Honolulu, Hawaii, U.S. as a research associate. Majid also holds another master's degree in War studies from the National Defence University in Islamabad, which he was conferred in 1991 after submitting his thesis to the university board. After his studies, he assumed the full professorship of war studies at the National Defence University and also taught strategic studies course at the Quaid-i-Azam University.

Military career

As a junior officer, Tariq Majid participated in the 1971 war and commanded a light anti-tank platoon against the Indian Army during the conflict.  After the war, he would later on served in the academic institutions of Pakistan military on deputation. On promotion to the rank of Lieutenant-Colonel in January 1988, he commanded the Infantry battalion in which he was originally commissioned; in 1991, he also commanded another Infantry battalion. In February 1994, he was promoted to one star rank, Brigadier and commanded two Infantry Brigades as General Staff Officer-1 (GSO-1). On elevation to the two-star rank of Major-General in February 1999, he was appointed General Officer Commanding of 10th Infantry Division, stationed at Lahore.

Staff and command appointments

Tariq Majid served in the major staff and command appointments in the Pakistan military. Upon promoting to brigadier, he was appointed as the General Staff Officer Grade-1 at the Directorate-General for Military Operations (DGMO). During his military career, he accepted the professorship in the military institutions, and briefly taught courses on military tactics at the School School of Infantry and Tactics (SC&T), and topics in strategic studies at the Command and Staff College in Quetta.

As a Brigadier, he was appointed Director Military Operations (Plans) in the Military Operations Directorate at General Headquarters and Deputy Commandant of Pakistan Military Academy.  In April 2001, he was appointed as director-general of Military Intelligence (DGMI) which he held until December 2003.

Chief of General Staff and Corps Commander

On 19 December 2003, Major-General Tariq Majid's promotion on three-star rank, Lieutenant-General, and appointed to the post of Chief of General Staff, in place of Lieutenant-General Shahid Aziz, who proceeded as the corps commander Lahore.  The post of chief of general staff is important in a sense that it heads the important military bureaus of Military Intelligence (MI) and Military Operations.

Tariq Majid's stint as the X Corps commander was eventful as it featured the suspension of Chief Justice Iftikhar Muhammad Chaudhry and the following mass protests, and the Operation Silence. In the latter occasion, he took over the planning of the Red mosque operation that was done on the direct instructions of the ousted President Pervez Musharraf.  According to media reports, the warnings of DGMO and MI were bypassed by President Musharraf and issued "direct" orders to commander of X Corps Lieutenant-General Tariq Majid. However, his critics made some allegations that Majid, being one of the confident, was thoroughly briefed of the Lal Masjid siege.

Soon, he gained significant publicity from this event, and was soon predicted by the media and the analysts to be promoted to the four-star assignments of either vice chief of army staff or chairman joint chiefs.  These predictions were true, when in October 2007, he was made the Chairman Joint Chiefs of Staff Committee.

Chairman Joint Chiefs of Staff Committee
 

Upon General P. Musharraf's retirement from the army, Majid's appointment to four star rank was highly speculated in the media and military science circles.  As early as in August and the following month, Majid was initially in the race to be appointed as chief of army staff. In military science circles, Majid was known to be a professional soldier and though, his closeness to Musharraf become a liability in country's political science circles.

On 3 October 2007, the media in Pakistan announced that Lieutenant-General Tariq Majid was promoted to four-star rank, and his nomination to succeed general Ehsan-ul-Haq was already approved by President Musharraf.  On 8 October 2007, he was sworn as chairman joint chiefs and took over the operations of Joint Staff Headquarters (JS HQ).

Upon taking the JS HQ secretariat, Majid became the only officer from the Baloch Regiment after Rahimuddin Khan to ascend to chairman joint chiefs. At the time of promotion, Tariq Majid was fourth on the seniority list. Lieutenant Generals Khalid Kidwai, Ashfaq Parvez Kayani (who was also promoted as four-star and made VCOAS), and Malik Arif Hayat were all senior to him, all of whom stood superseded and sought retirement. On race to the promotion to this four-star assignment, lieutenant-General Khalid Kidwai was already on a year's extension and another lieutenant-general Malik Arif Hayat had never commanded a corps thus virtually taking him out of the race for the top two slots in the army.

Less than a two weeks of being chairman joint chiefs, a suicide attack was struck on Majid when a suicide bomber struck a police checkpoint in the high security zone of Rawalpindi on October 30. It was carried out less than a kilometer from President General Pervez Musharraf's camp office, killing seven people, three of them policemen, and injuring 31 others. The blast splattered check post of General Tariq Majid's official residence. During the armed escalations with India, Majid served as the top military adviser to government and it was widely circulated that he, together with chiefs of navy, army and air force, had advised the president Asif Ali Zardari to take back his statement made last month, that his country would not be the first to use nuclear weapons in the event of a conflict with India". Responding to the India's military movement at the India-Pakistan border in 2010, General Majid told the Pakistan's media representatives at the ISPR that "the Indian army knows the capacity of the Pakistan armed forces. Responding to the Indian Army's Chief of Staff's statement of Indian military preparations to fight China and Pakistan simultaneously, Majid told the journalists that "leave alone China, General Deepak Kapoor knows very well what the Indian Army can not and Pakistan Armed Forces can pull off militarily.

As chairman joint chiefs, Majid notably terminated all military debriefings of senior scientist Abdul Qadeer Khan and recognized his services done to the country publicly on first week of November 2008.  Earlier to this, Majid was known for welcoming dr. Qadeer Khan in the country's military science circles where Qadeer Khan was still welcomed. In 2010, while lecturing on nuclear weapons politics, Majid endorsed Qadeer Khan's services and stressed to the fact that: "Pakistan had to be mindful of a blatant pursuit of military preponderance in its eastern neighborhood". Lecturing at the National Defence University, General Majid argued that "a proposed fissile material cutoff treaty would target Pakistan specifically. Islamabad has refused to allow talks on such a pact to proceed at the International Conference on Disarmament. As chairman joint chiefs, Majid had asserted his role as principal military adviser to the government of Prime minister Yousaf Raza Gillani and President Asif Ali Zardari on the matters involving the nuclear policy, military affairs, and geostrategic positions of Pakistan.  He presented the government a tri-services combat framework to tackle the joint combat operations against the extreme elements; a plan which was duly approved by Prime minister Gillani as part of his war strategy. While presenting this plan Majid noted to Prime minister Gillani that there is a need to harmonize individual capacities of the services so that efforts are synergized within a framework of jointness and inter-operability to meet present and future challenges. He played a vital role in devising the government to change its foreign policy to neutral matters in Afghanistan, and to lessen the American influence in the country which had dismayed the civil society of the country.

Views on nuclear disarmament

About the Afghan war, Majid is reported to have said, "Pakistan has become a "punching bag" in the American media, specifically the CNN." In a secret conversation with American ambassador Anne W. Patterson General Majid added, "It got to the point where we are looking at our own contingencies." Ambassador Patterson later replied that his statement was astonishing.  In 2007, Majid maintained to the country's media representatives, about the security of country's strategic nuclear arsenals that the nuclear and strategic assets are well protected with robust safeguards and very elaborate security system. Any irresponsible "act by any one against it will be responded very strongly at all levels of command", Majid quoted.

In a speech at the National Defence University and Quaid-i-Azam University, Majid outlines that atomic deterrence against a possible aggression was a compulsion, and not a choice for Pakistan.  Majid exhorted to the world delegation at the NDU that, "World must accept Pakistan as nuclear power." While dismissing all the concerns on the safety of country's nuclear arsenal, Majid maintains to the fact: "We are shouldering our responsibility with utmost vigilance and confidence. We have put in place a very robust regime that includes "multilayered mechanisms" and processes to secure our strategic assets, and have provided maximum transparency on our practices. We have reassured the international community on this issue over and over again and our track record since the time our atomic bomb programme was made overt has been unblemished".

Retirement

Prime Minister Yousaf Raza Gillani send the nomination of General Shameem Wynne as next Chairman Joint Chiefs of Staff Committee on October 8, 2010.  In the military circles, he well established his reputation as "pragmatic general" and "embodiment of professionalism thorough professional officer who sets and strives for high standards of excellence." General Khalid Shameem Wynne who was the senior-most general serving as Chief of General Staff (CGS) at the GHQ. Before retiring, General Majid completed all of his farewell meetings with important and key political and military leadership. In a simple but dignified ceremony amid Guard of Honour, General Majid handed over the operations of joint staff secretariat to incoming General Khalid Shameem Wynne.

Awards and decorations

Foreign decorations

See also
Military science

References

External links
Official profile of Gen Tariq Majid at ISPR website

 

|-
 

Chairmen Joint Chiefs of Staff Committee
Pakistani generals
1950 births
Living people
Recipients of the Legion of Honour
Recipients of Hilal-i-Imtiaz
Recipients of Nishan-e-Imtiaz
Academic staff of the National Defence University, Pakistan
National Defence University, Pakistan alumni
Academic staff of Quaid-i-Azam University
Military theorists
Counterinsurgency theorists
Pakistani military personnel of the Indo-Pakistani War of 1971
Baloch Regiment officers